Jan Andersen-Gott (born 5 October 1941 in Vågå, Oppland) is a Norwegian naval officer and trade unionist.

He was born in Vågå, and lives at Jarmyra. He took his education at the Norwegian Naval Academy and the Sjøforsvarets stabsskole, worked as an active naval Commander before being secretary of Sjømilitære Samfund and the naval officers' trade union. From 1987 to 1993 he led the Confederation of Vocational Unions. He then worked in the Norwegian Association of Local and Regional Authorities.

References

1941 births
Living people
People from Vågå
Royal Norwegian Naval Academy alumni
Royal Norwegian Navy personnel
Norwegian trade union leaders